Lost River is an unincorporated community in Paoli Township, Orange County, in the U.S. state of Indiana.

History
A post office was established at Lost River in 1837, and remained in operation until 1878. The community took its name from the nearby Lost River.

Geography

References

Unincorporated communities in Orange County, Indiana
Unincorporated communities in Indiana